Blue Swede were a Swedish rock band fronted by Björn Skifs which was active between the years 1973–1979. Blue Swede released two albums of cover versions, including a rendition of  "Hooked on a Feeling", which brought them international chart success. The band consisted of Anders Berglund (piano), Björn Skifs (lead vocals), Bosse Liljedahl (bass), Hinke Ekestubbe (saxophone), Jan Guldbäck (drums), Michael Areklew (guitar), Jamie Bethune (Cymbals) and Tommy Berglund (trumpet). They disbanded after Skifs decided to embark on his solo career.

Career
Blue Swede was first formed in 1973, when Björn Skifs, a top vocalist in Sweden, was looking for a band to accompany him during his concerts.

The band was originally called "Blåblus" (Swedish for "blue blouse" [could be made out of denim], a pun on the word "blues") and featured Skifs singing the lead vocals. The band got their international breakthrough in 1974 with their cover of the 1968 B. J. Thomas song "Hooked on a Feeling". Blue Swede recorded Thomas's song in 1973, but based its rendition of the song on a 1971 version released by British pop eccentric Jonathan King, which created the "ooga-chaka" introduction. Blue Swede released "Hooked on a Feeling" in Sweden in May 1973 and in the United States in February 1974. The song reached number one in the U.S. for one week in April 1974 and stayed in the Billboard Hot 100 chart for 18 weeks. The track also topped charts in Australia, Canada, and the Netherlands, where it reached a peak chart position of 26. To capitalize on the success of the song, Blue Swede released an album of the same name that same year.

Throughout the rest of 1974, two follow-up singles from the same album were released: "Silly Milly", which peaked at position 71 in the U.S., and a cover of The Association's "Never My Love", which made the Top Ten by peaking at position 7. From the band's 1974 follow-up album, Out of the Blue, they recorded a medley of "Hush" by Deep Purple and "I'm Alive" by Tommy James and the Shondells (not The Hollies' song of the same name), peaking at position 61 in the U.S, and achieving its greatest chart success in Scandinavia. Skifs left the band in 1975 and the band continued as Blåblus, releasing a further two albums.

Discography

Albums

Singles

See also 
List of Swedes in music
Dancing baby, a.k.a. The ooga-chaka baby

Notes

References

Swedish rock music groups
Musical groups established in 1973
Musical groups disestablished in 1975
Capitol Records artists
Swedish pop rock music groups
English-language singers from Sweden